Lazaros Kyrilidis (born 9 April 1963) is a retired Greek football midfielder.

References

1963 births
Living people
Greek footballers
Athlitiki Enosi Larissa F.C. players
Levadiakos F.C. players
Super League Greece players
Association football midfielders
People from Elassona
Footballers from Thessaly